is a 1999 role-playing video game developed by Nihon Falcom. It is the fifth game in The Legend of Heroes series, and the third and final title in the Gagharv trilogy. It was originally released for Windows and was remade for PlayStation Portable in 2006.

Plot
The game takes place in Weltluna, the third realm in Gagharv, seven years after A Tear of Vermillion and forty-nine years before Prophecy of the Moonlight Witch. It centers around Forte, Una and McBain and their quest in seeking Leone's Resonance Stones.

Reception

The PSP version received "mixed or average" reviews according to review aggregator Metacritic.

Notes

References

External links
 Official Falcom website

1999 video games
Japanese role-playing video games
Nihon Falcom games
PlayStation Portable games
Role-playing video games
Single-player video games
The Legend of Heroes
Video game remakes
Video games developed in Japan
Windows games